Amy McDonald (born 7 February 1998) is an Australian rules footballer playing for the Geelong Football Club in the AFL Women's (AFLW). McDonald is a three-time Geelong best and fairest winner and was named in the AFL Women's season seven All-Australian team.

Junior career
McDonald originally hails from Ballarat and played netball for Redan Football Netball Club, including an under 19s premiership in 2014 when she was just 15. A tap on the shoulder asking McDonald to fill a spot to ensure that the Youth Girl's team had enough numbers began her footballing career after taking a break from netball. 

McDonald won her second Ballarat youth girls league best and fairest award in 2014.

AFL Women's career
McDonald was selected with pick 80 in the 2019 AFL Women's draft, Geelong's fifth pick of the draft. She was notified that she would be drafted after playing in a losing VFL Women's finals loss.  McDonald made her AFL Women's debut in the opening round of the 2020 AFL Women's season against the Fremantle Dockers at Fremantle Oval in which the Geelong Cats lost. She had five disposals and two tackles on debut. Her side failed to make finals at the conclusion of the 2020 AFL Women's season and finished fifth on the conference A ladder.

McDonald was the winner of the Geelong best and fairest award in 2021, collecting 71 votes, almost double the vote tally of runner-up and inaugural winner Meg McDonald.

McDonald was Geelong's best player in its loss to North Melbourne in round 1 of the 2022 season, also polling six coaches' votes. McDonald was best afield in Geelong's first win of the season against  in round 5; she polled seven coaches' votes and was selected in womens.afls Team of the Week for that round. She was named in Champion Data's 2022 AFLW All-Star stats team after leading the competition for groundballs with 10.9 a game and averaging the third-most contested possessions with 13.1 a game. McDonald won her second Geelong best and fairest award in 2022, collecting 116 votes, 13 ahead of runner-up Rebecca Webster.

Statistics
Updated to the end of S7 (2022).

|-
| 2020 ||  || 3
| 6 || 0 || 0 || 30 || 46 || 76 || 8 || 22 || 0.0 || 0.0 || 5.0 || 7.7 || 12.7 || 2.3 || 3.7 || 0
|-
| 2021 ||  || 3
| 9 || 2 || 1 || 81 || 95 || 176 || 12 || 65 || 0.2 || 0.1 || 9.0 || 10.6 || 19.6 || 1.3 || 7.2 || 1
|-
| 2022 ||  || 3
| 10 || 0 || 2 || 85 || 125 || 210 || 5 || 81 || 0.0 || 0.2 || 8.5 || bgcolor=CAE1FF | 12.5† || 21.0 || 0.5 || 8.1 || 8
|-
| S7 (2022) ||  || 3
| 11 || 1 || 5 || 113 || bgcolor=CAE1FF | 160† || 273 || 16 || 81 || 0.1 || 0.5 || 10.3 || bgcolor=CAE1FF | 14.5† || bgcolor=CAE1FF | 24.8† || 1.5 || 7.4 || 12
|- class=sortbottom
! colspan=3 | Career
! 36 !! 3 !! 8 !! 309 !! 426 !! 735 !! 41 !! 249 !! 0.1 !! 0.2 !! 8.6 !! 11.8 !! 20.4 !! 1.1 !! 6.9 !! 21
|}

Honours and achievements
 AFL Women's All-Australian team: S7 (2022)
 3× Geelong best and fairest: 2021, 2022, S7 (2022)

References

External links

 
 
 

Living people
1998 births
Geelong Football Club (AFLW) players
Australian rules footballers from Victoria (Australia)
Sportswomen from Victoria (Australia)